Ivan Bionchik (born 7 October 1985) is a Belarusian professional football coach and a former player.

Career
In 2017, he led his club Luch Minsk to Belarusian First League title and promotion to Premier League.

References

External links 

1985 births
Living people
Belarusian footballers
Association football defenders
FC SKVICH Minsk players
FC Kommunalnik Slonim players
FC Molodechno players
Belarusian football managers
FC Dnyapro Mogilev managers
FC Gomel managers
FC Shakhtyor Soligorsk managers
FC Slavia Mozyr managers